Theeraatha Bandhangal is a 1982 Indian Malayalam film, directed by Dr. Joshua. The film stars Babu Joseph and Salini in the lead roles. The film has musical score by K. Raghavan.

Cast
Babu Joseph
Salini

Soundtrack
The music was composed by K. Raghavan and the lyrics were written by Poovachal Khader.

References

External links
 

1982 films
1980s Malayalam-language films